Treglown is a surname. Notable people with the surname include:

Claude Treglown (1893–1980), English cricketer
Jeremy Treglown (born 1946), English literary scholar